The 1989 Torneo Godó was a men's professional tennis tournament that was played on outdoor clay courts at the Real Club de Tenis Barcelona in Barcelona, Catalonia, Spain that was part of the Championship Series of the 1989 Grand Prix circuit. It was the 37th edition of the tournament and took place from 18 September to 24 September 1989. Unseeded Andrés Gómez won the singles title.

Finals

Singles
 Andrés Gómez defeated  Horst Skoff 6–4, 6–4, 6–2
 It was Gómez' 2nd singles title of the year and the 17th of his career.

Doubles
 Gustavo Luza /  Christian Miniussi defeated  Sergio Casal /  Tomáš Šmíd 7–6, 5–7, 6–3

References

External links
 Official tournament website
 ITF tournament edition details
 ATP tournament profile

Barcelona Open (tennis)
Torneo Godo
Torneo Godó
Torneo Godó